Caroline Mary Saunders  is a New Zealand academic, and as of 2020 is a Distinguished Professor at Lincoln University, specialising in environmental economics. She is a Fellow of the Royal Society Te Apārangi.

Academic career 

After a BSc (Hons) at the University College of North Wales (now Bangor University), Saunders completed a PhD titled Intra-EC agricultural trade with special reference to wheat at Newcastle University in 1984. Saunders was then appointed as a lecturer at the University of Newcastle, before moving in 1996 to Lincoln University as a senior lecturer. Saunders was appointed as a Distinguished Professor in November 2020, one of only four at Lincoln University. She is Professor of International Trade and the Environment and is Director of the Agribusiness and Economics Research Unit.

Saunders's research focuses on environmental economics and trade. She is particularly known for her work on food miles, showing that New Zealand dairy products, lamb and apples in the British marketplace do not have a higher environmental impact than local products. Saunders has worked for the EU Commission, FAO, MFAT, the New Zealand Treasury, OECD and Fonterra, among others. She was also appointed as a member of the Reserve Bank's Monetary Policy Committee, and is a Director of Landcare Research.

Honours and awards 
In 2007, Saunders was the NZIER Economist of the Year. She was appointed an Officer of the New Zealand Order of Merit, for services to agricultural research, in the 2009 New Year Honours.

Saunders was selected as one of the Royal Society Te Apārangi's 150 women in 150 words in 2017. She was on the Council of the  Royal Society Te Apārangi from 2015 to 2018. In 2019, the Agricultural Economics Society in the UK appointed Saunders as its President, a role which she is still filling in a caretaker capacity as of 2021.

In March 2021, Saunders was made a Fellow of the Royal Society Te Apārangi, in recognition of her "outstanding contributions to the advancement of science by creating new knowledge in her research field of agriculture and economics".

Selected works

References 

New Zealand women academics
Alumni of Newcastle University
Academic staff of the Lincoln University (New Zealand)
Officers of the New Zealand Order of Merit
New Zealand economists
Year of birth missing (living people)
Living people
Fellows of the Royal Society of New Zealand
Alumni of Bangor University
Academics of Newcastle University